Actia maksymovi is a Palearctic species of fly in the family Tachinidae.

Distribution
United Kingdom (Where it is rare), Switzerland, France, Czech Republic, Japan, Mongolia, Russia.

Hosts
Tortricidae.

References

crassicornis
Muscomorph flies of Europe
Diptera of Asia
Insects described in 1952